Vollmer Island is an ice-covered island  long, lying along the edge of Sulzberger Ice Shelf,  northwest of Cronenwett Island. It appears that this feature was first observed and roughly mapped from aerial photographs taken by the Byrd Antarctic Expedition, 1928–30. Named by Advisory Committee on Antarctic Names (US-ACAN) for Lieutenant T.H. Vollmer, U.S. Navy, engineering officer aboard USS Glacier along this coast, 1961–62.

See also 
 List of antarctic and sub-antarctic islands

Islands of the Ross Dependency
King Edward VII Land